Heathen is an American thrash metal band originating from the San Francisco Bay Area, active from 1984 to 1993 and again from 2001 onwards. Despite never achieving commercial success, the band is often credited – alongside Exodus, Testament, Forbidden, Death Angel and Vio-lence – as one of the leaders of the Bay Area thrash metal scene of the mid-to-late 1980s, and they have gone through several lineup changes, leaving guitarist Lee Altus as the only constant member. To date, Heathen has released four studio albums: Breaking the Silence (1987),  Victims of Deception (1991), The Evolution of Chaos (2009) and Empire of the Blind (2020).

History

Early history (1984–1987)
Heathen was formed in 1984 by guitarist Lee Altus and drummer Carl Sacco (formerly of Metal Church), who later recruited lead vocalist Sam Kress and guitarist Jim Sanguinetti (who went on to found the band Mordred). Shortly after their first gig in 1985, Kress and Sanguinetti left the group and were replaced by vocalist David White (formerly of Blind Illusion) and guitarist Doug Piercy (formerly of Anvil Chorus and Control). The band also recruited bassist Eric Wong around this time. This lineup debuted in early 1986 and soon became prolific around the Bay Area. Their early style could be described as the aggression of thrash metal combined with NWOBHM-style vocals and arrangements, acoustic intros or outros, and fast-paced melodic shred solos.

Heathen's break came when they released their Pray For Death demo, which in 1987 resulted in their signing by Combat Records. Shortly after their signing Eric Wong left the band to join Piranha, and was replaced on bass by former Griffin guitarist Mike "Yaz" Jastremski.

Breaking the Silence (1987–1990)
Heathen's debut album Breaking the Silence was released in 1987. The album was well received critically and featured one very successful single, a cover of the 1970s glam rock band Sweet's song "Set Me Free". The song got some rock radio airplay and the video received rotation on MTV's Headbangers Ball. The band embarked on a tour in support of the album, which included a series of dates with Megadeth, King Diamond, Testament, Exodus, Savatage, Zoetrope, Dark Angel and Lizzy Borden, among others.

In 1988, Carl Sacco left due to musical differences. He was replaced by Darren Minter. Mike Jastremski left the band shortly after, and the band went through number of bassists and vocalists between 1988 and 1991. In 1989, David White left the band due to personal and musical differences. For a few months the late ex-Exodus vocalist Paul Baloff became the band's vocalist. They also briefly toured with late Metal Church vocalist David Wayne. In late 1988, Rick Weaver was recruited from The Dispossessed who had opened for the Midwest leg of the Heathen's national tour. He left amicably in 1989 citing creative differences, and White returned to Heathen later that year.

Victims of Deception and breakup (1991–1993)
In order to record their album Victims of Deception, Heathen recruited Blind Illusion mainman Marc Biedermann to play bass in the studio. The album was released in 1991 through Roadrunner Records. Victims of Deception was considerably more technical than Breaking the Silence, featuring odd time signatures, more complex riffs and songs, tempo and key changes, and longer song lengths, and is often described as progressive thrash metal, retaining little of the NWOBHM influence its predecessor had exhibited.  It was also highly critically acclaimed, though it was not quite as commercially successful as Breaking the Silence. The band's cover of Rainbow's "Kill the King" and original ballad "Prisoners of Fate" were released as singles and had minor rock radio airplay. The band again toured in support of the album, notably touring Europe with Sepultura and Sacred Reich.

That year Heathen found a permanent bassist in Randy Laire and toured extensively until the untimely death of Laire and his girlfriend in a car accident. The band replaced him with Jason VieBrooks. Doug Piercy departed from the band in 1992 and was replaced by Ira Black. The band planned to record a covers EP dedicated to Laire and his girlfriend as well as White's deceased brother Jeffery, but the band went on hiatus in 1993.

Reunion (2001–2008)
Heathen reunited in 2001, its lineup comprising David White, Lee Altus, Ira Black, Mike Jastremski and Darren Minter, to play the Thrash of the Titans benefit concert to help Chuck Billy and Chuck Schuldiner raise funds for Billy's throat cancer treatment and Schuldiner's brain cancer treatment. The concert was a huge success, but in 2004, Jastremski left the band again, and was replaced by Ulysses Siren bassist Jon Torres. An EP, Recovered, was released on Relentless Metal Records, consisting of Victims of Deception-era demos and newly recorded cover songs. A new demo was released in August 2005, containing three new songs.

Heathen recruited Terry Lauderdale in 2005 to be the second guitarist in the group and toured across Europe. Also in 2005, Lee Altus joined Bay Area thrashers Exodus, but remained a member of Heathen. In November 2007, the band recruited Prototype guitarist Kragen Lum and Mark Hernandez to replace Darren Minter and Lauderdale. Minter returned to the band the following year.

The Evolution of Chaos (2009–2018)

The band released their first studio album in nearly two decades, The Evolution of Chaos, on King Records in Japan December 23, 2009, on Mascot Records in Europe January 25, 2010, and on Mascot Records USA in America in February 2010.

Heathen played at the Rock Hard Festival in Germany 2009 and later supported Testament, Exodus, and Kreator at Thrash Domination in Kawasaki, Japan. In support of The Evolution of Chaos, Heathen toured in April and May 2010 after having to cancel their planned March dates. In 2012, Heathen announced that they had signed a contract with Nuclear Blast Records for future albums. In the spring of 2013, the band announced the departure of longtime drummer Darren Minter. Former Evildead, Slayer and Testament drummer Jon Dette replaced him on the band's subsequent European tour.

Heathen took part in the European Thrashfest Classics 2011 European tour, also featuring Sepultura, Exodus, Destruction and Mortal Sin. The tour concluded in Vienna, Austria on December 18, 2011.

Empire of the Blind (2019–present)
On January 16, 2019, Heathen announced on their Facebook page that they had begun working on new material for their fourth studio album.

On February 26, 2020, Heathen uploaded a flyer on their Facebook page, revealing the artwork and Empire of the Blind as the title of their fourth album. This flyer was available at the merchandise table during the European Bay Strikes Back tour featuring Testament, Exodus and Death Angel. On June 26, 2020, Heathen released "The Blight" as the lead single from Empire of the Blind and announced that the album would be released on September 18. Due to the COVID-19 pandemic, the band had not been able to tour in support of Empire of the Blind for nearly two years. Heathen toured Europe in June with Toxik, and along with Exodus and Death Angel, they toured there through July and August by supporting Testament on the latter's Titans of Creation tour. The band will also tour Europe in April 2023 with Overkill and Exhorder.

Shortly before the release of Empire of the Blind, guitarist Kragen Lum mentioned that Heathen could work on a fifth album in 2021: "Every band on the planet is gonna want a tour next year. I think it's going to be a logistical problem in terms of the number of venues and dates and tour buses available and crew available. It's gonna be a challenge because everybody's gonna want to go out. We're just gonna do the very best that we can, and, and like I said, stay positive and promote the record. And if for some reason next year it proves to be a challenge in terms of touring or it's limited, then we're gonna probably start working on another record. It takes us long enough; we better start the running now!!"

Members

Current members
Lee Altus – guitars (1984–1993, 2001–present)
David White – lead vocals (1985–1988, 1989–1993, 2001–present)
Kragen Lum – guitars, backing vocals (2007–present)
Jason Mirza – bass (2019–present)
Jim DeMaria – drums (2019–present)

Discography
 Breaking the Silence (1987)
 Victims of Deception (1991)
 The Evolution of Chaos (2009)
 Empire of the Blind (2020)

References

External links

Musical groups established in 1984
Musical groups from San Francisco
American speed metal musical groups
Musical groups disestablished in 1993
Musical groups reestablished in 2001
Thrash metal musical groups from California
Roadrunner Records artists
Musical quintets
Nuclear Blast artists